Krasnoarmeyskoye is a rural locality (a selo) in the Krasnoarmeysky District in Samara Oblast, Russia. Population:

References

Rural localities in Samara Oblast